Association Sportive de Wetr, or simply AS Wetr, is a New Caledonian football team, competing in the New Caledonia Super Ligue. Its colors are blue and white.

Stadium

The current the club stadium is the Stade Edouard Pentecost, in the city of Nouméa, with a capacity for 1,000 spectators.

Squad

Updated May 2021.

References

Football clubs in New Caledonia